Catechumen is a Roman-themed first-person shooter video game developed by N'Lightning Software Development. Set in ancient Rome, during the days of the early Christian church, the game follows a young Christian student as he delves deep into a labyrinth of Roman catacombs in order to rescue his mentor and brethren from Satan and his demons. Catechumen was released for Microsoft Windows in October 2000, to mixed reception.

Catechumen is known for being one of the most expensive Christian video games made. N'Lightning spent nearly $830,000 during the development process, although the game's disappointing sales along with its spiritual successor released in 2001, Ominous Horizons: A Paladin's Calling, eventually led to the company's disbandment. According to N'Lightning founder Ralph Bagley, investors were initially hesitant to fund Catechumens development until after the Columbine High School massacre on April 20, 1999. The two perpetrator's tendencies to play violent video games made a lower-violence video game alternative appealing to investors.

Plot 
Catechumen is set in the year A.D. 171 during the reign of the Roman emperor Marcus Aurelius, a persecutor of Christians. During this period, new Christian converts were guided by a mentor for at least a year in which the new converts were referred to as Catechumen. The game's opening cutscene reveals that the player's mentor and fellow brethren have been captured by demon-possessed Roman soldiers and locked in the deepest Roman catacombs. Being a Catechumen, it is the player's job to delve into the Roman catacombs to free them. With the help of various angels, the player eventually frees his brethren at the end of the game by banishing the leader of the demons, Satan, back into the underworld.

Gameplay 

Catechumen'''s first-person shooter gameplay is similar in many respects to Quake. The player travels through 18 different levels that progressively get darker and more demonic. The first levels take place in Rome and around the Roman Colosseum. As the player ventures deeper and deeper into the Roman catacombs, he eventually reaches Hell itself. As the player progresses, he receives weapons given to him by various angels.

The game features a total of eight weapons that can be obtained over the course of the game. Weapons in Catechumen are functionally similar to firearms in many first-person shooter games released at the time. The Gold Sword, for example, emits rapid-firing projectiles analogous to a machine gun, while the Lightning Sword fires a continuous beam of energy similar to the Lightning Gun in Quake. Solomon's Scepter is a late-game weapon that lobs large balls of explosive energy that deal splash damage, similar to the Rocket Launcher in Quake. Swords can be found lying on the ground throughout levels which can be picked up to increase the player's "ammunition" for that particular type of sword.

Rather than having a life meter, Catechumen has a "faith" meter that depletes when taking damage from enemies. Players can replenish their faith meter by picking up scrolls strewn throughout levels with bible verses written on them.

Enemies become more demonic as the player progresses in the game as well. Enemies include demon-possessed Roman soldiers as well as demons. The game also features three bosses: the Minotaur, a pair of Leviathans, and the final boss being Satan himself. Human enemies notably cannot be killed in the game. After being defeated by the player, they get on their knees to pray to God instead and the Hallelujah chorus from Handel's Messiah briefly plays in the background.

A secret "Hall of Fame" level is unlocked if the player beats the game on the "Impossible" difficulty. The level contains framed pictures on the wall of Catechumens development team.

 Reception 

Combined sales of Catechumen and N'Lightning's Ominous Horizons: A Paladin's Calling reached above 100,000 units by October 2003.Catechumen received mixed reviews, holding a score of 53% on GameRankings. Being a religious game, Catechumen'' was generally received better by Christian critics than secular ones. Movieguide reviewer Michael Ballmann noted the game's AI was "lackluster" but stated that the game "has done its job adequately" and that it was the best Christian game he had ever played. Secular reviewer Johnny Liu from Game Revolution was more critical towards the game, giving it a D−. Criticizing the game's poor enemy AI and outdated graphics, he concluded his review by saying that "[t]he only thing saving it from an F is our healthy fear of God".

References

External links 
 

2000 video games
Christian video games
First-person shooters
Windows games
Windows-only games
Video games about angels
Video games developed in the United States
Video games set in the Roman Empire
Single-player video games